Bad Aibling is a spa town and former district seat in Bavaria on the river Mangfall, located some  southeast of Munich. It features a luxury health resort with a peat pulp bath and mineral spa.

History 

Bad Aibling and its surroundings were settled by Celtic tribes from about 500BC until 15BC. After Roman occupation, it was finally settled by Bavarii tribes in the 5th century AD. In 804 Bad Aibling was mentioned for the first time as "Epininga".

In mediaeval times, it was an administrative centre in the lordship of the Counts of Falkenstein. In 1166 it was mentioned in the Codex diplomaticus Falkensteinensis as "Aibilingen". After the obliteration of the Neuburg-Falkenstein dynasty, it became part of the realm of the Wittelsbach family.

In 1845 the first treatments with peat pulp were offered by the physician Desiderius Beck. Bad Aibling received the title "Bad" (spa or springs) in 1895.

In the year 1933, Bad Aibling officially became a town. After the Second World War, Bad Aibling was the site of POW Discharge Center #26, where German POWs were released from captivity to civilian status. In 1946, a DP camp housing former members of the Royal Yugoslav Army was set up on the grounds of the town's airbase. The camp was first operated by UNRRA, and later by the IRO. From 1948 onwards, the area was home to the IRO Children's Village, a DP camp for unaccompanied children and youth belonging to more than 20 nationalities. Over 2,300 inhabitants passed through this facility (the largest of its kind in the US Zone) before it was closed in late 1951. Later, the area evolved into a major centre for intelligence organizations and secret services.

In 2005 the American Bad Aibling ECHELON station (Field Station 81) closed after several decades of operation. After the departure of the NSA, parts of the station have been used by the Bundesnachrichtendienst (BND), with NSA employees moving to the Mangfall barracks. The radomes are still used intensively. The station is used in cooperation with the NSA, which provides the BND with search terms (such as email addresses), which then forwards the results back to the NSA.

The Thermae opened in 2007, complementing the traditional peat pulp baths with mineral water (Desiderius-Quelle). In the same year, the historical Ludwigsbad spa hotel, the nucleus of Bad Aibling's health resort business, burned down due to arson.

On 9 February 2016, a serious railway accident occurred near the town when two passenger trains collided, causing 11 fatalities.

Geography and demographics

Bad Aibling consists of the neighborhoods (Stadtteile) of Abel, Adlfurt, Bad Aibling Mitte, Berbling, Ellmosen, Fachendorf, Gröben, Harthausen, Haslach, Heimathsberg, Heinrichsdorf, Holzhausen, Köckbrunn, Markfeld, Mietraching, Mitterham, Moos, Natternberg, Thalacker, Thürham, Unterheufeld, Weg, Westen, Westerham, Willing, and Zell.

Economy and infrastructure 

In Bad Aibling there are several large spa hotels and rehabilitation hospitals that rely on peat pulp as a basic treatment. Additionally, in 2007 the new thermae were opened.

Companies based in Bad Aibling 

Several companies in the pharmaceutical industry, textile manufacturing, electrical engineering, plastics manufacturing, and dairy processing are located in Bad Aibling.

Administration and public institutions 

 Municipal institutions
 Employment office Bad Aibling
 Institutions of the Rosenheim district office (veterinary office, motor vehicle registration authority)
 Local court
 Bundesnachrichtendienst (BND), Federal Intelligence Service

Mayors

Education 

 German football boarding school (Deutsches Fußballinternat Bad Aibling)
 Gymnasium Bad Aibling (high school for secondary education)
 Wilhelm-Leibl-Realschule (secondary school)
 Wirtschaftsschule Alpenland (secondary school for economics)
 Grund- und Hauptschulen (primary and secondary education)
 Sonderschule (primary and secondary education for children with special needs)
 Volkshochschule Bad Aibling (adult evening classes)

Number of inhabitants

 1840: 2.597
 1871: 3.479
 1900: 5.181
 1925: 6.218
 1939: 7.764
 1950: 10.908
 1961: 9.991
 1970: 10.860
 1987: 12.583 (census)
 2000: 16.437
 2010: 18.272
 2015: 18.408

Culture and attractions

Echelon festival 

The Echelon Open Air & Indoor Festival is an electro-, techno and house-festival that has taken place in Bad Aibling annually in August since 2009.  With about 25.000 visitors in 2015 it is the largest festival of its kind in Bavaria. It is located on the abandoned Bad Aibling Station which was used for the festival's eponymous global surveillance network ECHELON.

Twin town 

Bad Aibling has been twinned with
  Cavaion Veronese, Italy, since 2006.

People affiliated with Bad Aibling 

 Julian Weigl(born 1995), German footballer for Sport Lisboa e Benfica
 Eleonore Baur(18851981), also known as Sister Pia, a senior Nazi figure
 Desiderius Beck(), was a Bavarian court physician. In 1845, he opened the first Bavarian brine and peat mud baths in Bad Aibling in Rose Street, later Ludwig bathroom.
 Eduard Dietl(18901944), German general of World War II
 Amelie Kober(born 1987), German Federal Police officer and Olympic medalist in snowboarding
 Wilhelm Leibl(18441900), German realist painter of portraits and scenes of peasant life
 Johann Sperl(18401914), German painter
 Friedrich Meggendorfer(18801953), German psychiatrist and neurologist
 Joseph Maximilian von Maillinger (1820-1901), General of Infantry of Bavarian Army
 Franz Osten (1876-1956), German film director, who lived after the Second World War in the town
 Klaus Wennemann (1940-2000), actor

References

External links 

 
 The health and cure administration
 Bad Aibling RSOC (Regional SIGINT Operation Center) Photos

 
Rosenheim (district)
Spa towns in Germany
Towns in Bavaria